Nahoon Dam is a gravity type dam located on the Nahoon River, near East London, Eastern Cape, South Africa. It was established in 1966 and serves primarily for domestic supply and industrial use. The hazard potential of the dam has been ranked high (3).

See also
List of reservoirs and dams in South Africa
List of rivers of South Africa

References 

 List of South African Dams from the Department of Water Affairs

Dams in South Africa
Dams completed in 1966